Herpetopoma helix is a species of sea snail, a marine gastropod mollusk in the family Chilodontidae.

Description
The height of the shell attains 4 mm.

Distribution
This species occurs in the Indian Ocean off KwaZuluNatal, Rep. South Africa, to Madagascar

References

External links
 To World Register of Marine Species
 

helix
Gastropods described in 1964